Hittite (natively   /  "the language of Neša", or nešumnili /  "the language of the people of Neša"), also known as Nesite (Nešite / Neshite, Nessite), is an extinct Indo-European language that was spoken by the Hittites, a people of Bronze Age Anatolia who created an empire centred on Hattusa, as well as parts of the northern Levant and Upper Mesopotamia. The language, now long extinct, is attested in cuneiform, in records dating from the 17th (Anitta text) to the 13th centuries BCE, with isolated Hittite loanwords and numerous personal names appearing in an Old Assyrian context from as early as the 20th century BCE, making it the earliest-attested use of the Indo-European languages.

By the Late Bronze Age, Hittite had started losing ground to its close relative Luwian. It appears that in the 13th century BCE, Luwian was the most widely spoken language in the Hittite capital, Hattusa. After the collapse of the Hittite New Kingdom during the more general Late Bronze Age collapse, Luwian emerged in the Early Iron Age as the main language of the so-called Syro-Hittite states, in southwestern Anatolia and northern Syria.

Name

Hittite is the modern scholarly name for the language, based on the identification of the Hatti (Ḫatti) kingdom with the Biblical Hittites, although that name appears to have been applied incorrectly: The term Hattian refers to the indigenous people who preceded the Hittites, speaking a non-Indo-European Hattic language.

In multilingual texts found in Hittite locations, passages written in Hittite are preceded by the adverb  (or), "in the [speech] of Neša (Kaneš)", an important city during the early stages of the Hittite Old Kingdom. In one case, the label is Kanisumnili, "in the [speech] of the people of Kaneš".

Although the Hittite New Kingdom had people from many diverse ethnic and linguistic backgrounds, the Hittite language was used in most secular written texts. In spite of various arguments over the appropriateness of the term, Hittite remains the most current term because of convention and the strength of association with the Biblical Hittites. The endonymic term , and its Anglicized variants (Nesite, Nessite, Neshite), have never caught on.

Decipherment
The first substantive claim as to the affiliation of Hittite was made by Jørgen Alexander Knudtzon in 1902, in a book devoted to two letters between the king of Egypt and a Hittite ruler, found at El-Amarna, Egypt. Knudtzon argued that Hittite was Indo-European, largely because of its morphology. Although he had no bilingual texts, he was able to provide a partial interpretation of the two letters because of the formulaic nature of the diplomatic correspondence of the period. His argument was not generally accepted, partly because the morphological similarities he observed between Hittite and Indo-European can be found outside of Indo-European and also because the interpretation of the letters was justifiably regarded as uncertain.

Knudtzon was definitively shown to have been correct when many tablets written in the familiar Akkadian cuneiform script but in an unknown language were discovered by Hugo Winckler in what is now the village of Boğazköy, Turkey, which was the former site of Hattusa, the capital of the Hittite state. Based on a study of this extensive material, Bedřich Hrozný succeeded in analyzing the language. He presented his argument that the language is Indo-European in a paper published in 1915 (Hrozný 1915), which was soon followed by a grammar of the language (Hrozný 1917). Hrozný's argument for the Indo-European affiliation of Hittite was thoroughly modern although poorly substantiated. He focused on the striking similarities in idiosyncratic aspects of the morphology that are unlikely to occur independently by chance or to be borrowed. They included the r/n alternation in some noun stems (the heteroclitics) and vocalic ablaut, which are both seen in the alternation in the word for water between the nominative singular, wadar, and the genitive singular, wedenas. He also presented a set of regular sound correspondences. After a brief initial delay because of disruption during the First World War, Hrozný's decipherment, tentative grammatical analysis and demonstration of the Indo-European affiliation of Hittite were rapidly accepted and more broadly substantiated by contemporary scholars such as Edgar H. Sturtevant, who authored the first scientifically acceptable Hittite grammar with a chrestomathy and a glossary. The most up-to-date grammar of the Hittite language is currently Hoffner and Melchert (2008).

Classification
Hittite is one of the Anatolian languages and is known from cuneiform tablets and inscriptions that were erected by the Hittite kings. The script formerly known as "Hieroglyphic Hittite" is now termed Hieroglyphic Luwian. The Anatolian branch also includes Cuneiform Luwian, Hieroglyphic Luwian, Palaic, Lycian, Milyan, Lydian, Carian, Pisidian, Sidetic and Isaurian.

Unlike most other Indo-European languages, Hittite does not distinguish between masculine and feminine grammatical gender, and it lacks subjunctive and optative moods as well as aspect. Various hypotheses have been formulated to explain these differences.

Some linguists, most notably Edgar H. Sturtevant and Warren Cowgill, have argued that Hittite should be classified as a sister language to Proto-Indo-European, rather than as a daughter language. Their Indo-Hittite hypothesis is that the parent language (Indo-Hittite) lacked the features that are absent in Hittite as well, and that Proto-Indo-European later innovated them.

Other linguists, however, prefer the Schwund ("loss") Hypothesis in which Hittite (or Anatolian) came from Proto-Indo-European, with its full range of features, but the features became simplified in Hittite.

According to Craig Melchert, the current tendency (as of 2012) is to suppose that Proto-Indo-European evolved and that the "prehistoric speakers" of Anatolian  became isolated "from the rest of the PIE speech community, so as not to share in some common innovations". Hittite and the other Anatolian languages split off from Proto-Indo-European at an early stage. Hittite thus preserved archaisms that would be lost in the other Indo-European languages.

Hittite has many loanwords, particularly religious vocabulary from the non-Indo-European Hurrian and Hattic languages. The latter was the language of the Hattians, the local inhabitants of the land of Hatti before they were absorbed or displaced by the Hittites. Sacred and magical texts from Hattusa were often written in Hattic, Hurrian and Luwian even after Hittite had become the norm for other writings.

History 
The Hittite language has traditionally been stratified into Old Hittite (OH), Middle Hittite (MH) and New Hittite or Neo-Hittite (NH, not to be confused with the polysemic use of "Neo-Hittite" label as a designation for the later period, which is actually post-Hittite), corresponding to the Old, Middle and New Kingdoms of the Hittite history (ca. 1750–1500 BCE, 1500–1430 BCE and 1430–1180 BCE, respectively). The stages are differentiated on both linguistic and paleographic grounds.

In a 2019 work, Hittitologist Alwin Kloekhorst recognizes two dialectal variants of Hittite: one he calls "Kanišite Hittite", and a second he named "Ḫattuša Hittite" (or Hittite proper). The first is attested in clay tablets from Kaniš/Neša (Kültepe), and is dated earlier than the findings from Ḫattuša.

Script

Hittite was written in an adapted form of Peripheral Akkadian cuneiform orthography from Northern Syria. The predominantly syllabic nature of the script makes it difficult to ascertain the precise phonetic qualities of some of the Hittite sound inventory.

The syllabary distinguishes the following consonants (notably, the Akkadian s series is dropped),
b, d, g, ḫ, k, l, m, n, p, r, š, t, z, combined with the vowels a, e, i, u. Additionally, ya (= I.A), wa (= PI) and wi (= wi5 = GEŠTIN) signs are introduced.

The Akkadian unvoiced/voiced series (k/g, p/b, t/d) do not express the voiced/unvoiced contrast in writing, but double spellings in intervocalic positions represent voiceless consonants in Indo-European (Sturtevant's law).

Phonology

The limitations of the syllabic script in helping to determine the nature of Hittite phonology have been more or less overcome by means of comparative etymology and an examination of Hittite spelling conventions. Accordingly, scholars have surmised that Hittite possessed the following phonemes:

Vowels

Long vowels appear as alternates to their corresponding short vowels when they are so conditioned by the accent.
Phonemically distinct long vowels occur infrequently.

Consonants

Plosives
Hittite had two series of consonants, one which was written always geminate in the original script, and another that was always simple. In cuneiform, all consonant sounds except for glides could be geminate. It has long been noticed that the geminate series of plosives is the one descending from Proto-Indo-European voiceless stops, and the simple plosives come from both voiced and voiced aspirate stops, which is often referred as Sturtevant's law. Because of the typological implications of Sturtevant's law, the distinction between the two series is commonly regarded as one of voice. However, there is no agreement over the subject among scholars since some view the series as if they were differenced by length, which a literal interpretation of the cuneiform orthography would suggest.

Supporters of a length distinction usually point the fact that Akkadian, the language from which the Hittites borrowed the cuneiform script, had voicing, but Hittite scribes used voiced and voiceless signs interchangeably. Alwin Kloekhorst also argues that the absence of assimilatory voicing is also evidence for a length distinction. He points out that the word "e-ku-ud-du - [ɛ́gʷtu]" does not show any voice assimilation. However, if the distinction were one of voice, agreement between the stops should be expected since the velar and the alveolar plosives are known to be adjacent since that word's "u" represents not a vowel but labialization.

Laryngeals
Hittite preserves some very archaic features lost in other Indo-European languages. For example, Hittite has retained two of the three laryngeals ( and  word-initially). Those sounds, whose existence had been hypothesized in 1879 by Ferdinand de Saussure, on the basis of vowel quality in other Indo-European languages, were not preserved as separate sounds in any attested Indo-European language until the discovery of Hittite. In Hittite, the phoneme is written as ḫ. In that respect, Hittite is unlike any other attested Indo-European language and so the discovery of laryngeals in Hittite was a remarkable confirmation of Saussure's hypothesis.

Both the preservation of the laryngeals and the lack of evidence that Hittite shared certain grammatical features in the other early Indo-European languages have led some philologists to believe that the Anatolian languages split from the rest of Proto-Indo-European much earlier than the other divisions of the proto-language. See #Classification above for more details.

Morphology

Hittite is the oldest attested Indo-European language, yet it lacks several grammatical features that are exhibited by other early-attested Indo-European languages such as Vedic, Classical Latin, Ancient Greek, Old Persian and Old Avestan. Notably, Hittite did not have a masculine-feminine gender system. Instead, it had a rudimentary noun-class system that was based on an older animate–inanimate opposition.

Nouns
Hittite inflects for nine cases: nominative, vocative, accusative, genitive, dative-locative, ablative, ergative, allative, and instrumental; two numbers: singular, and plural; and two animacy classes: animate (common), and inanimate (neuter). Adjectives and pronouns agree with nouns for animacy, number, and case.

The distinction in animacy is rudimentary and generally occurs in the nominative case, and the same noun is sometimes attested in both animacy classes. There is a trend towards distinguishing fewer cases in the plural than in the singular and a trend towards distinguishing the plural in fewer cases. The ergative case is used when an inanimate noun is the subject of a transitive verb. Early Hittite texts have a vocative case for a few nouns with -u, but it ceased to be productive by the time of the earliest discovered sources and was subsumed by the nominative in most documents. The allative was subsumed in the later stages of the language by the dative-locative. An archaic genitive plural -an is found irregularly in earlier texts, as is an instrumental plural in -it. A few nouns also form a distinct locative, which had no case ending at all.

The examples of pišna- ("man") for animate and pēda- ("place") for inanimate are used here to show the Hittite noun declension's most basic form:

Verbs
The verbal morphology is less complicated than for other early-attested Indo-European languages like Ancient Greek and Vedic. Hittite verbs inflect according to two general conjugations (mi-conjugation and hi-conjugation), two voices (active and medio-passive), two moods (indicative mood and imperative), two aspects (perfective and imperfective), and two tenses (present, and preterite). Verbs have two infinitive forms, a verbal noun, a supine, and a participle. Rose (2006) lists 132 hi verbs and interprets the hi/mi oppositions as vestiges of a system of grammatical voice ("centripetal voice" vs. "centrifugal voice").

Mi-conjugation
The  mi-conjugation is similar to the general verbal conjugation paradigm in Sanskrit and can also be compared to the class of mi-verbs in Ancient Greek. The following example uses the verb ēš-/aš- "to be".

Active voice

Syntax
Hittite is a head-final language: it has subject-object-verb word order, a split ergative alignment, and is a synthetic language; adpositions follow their complement, adjectives and genitives precede the nouns that they modify, adverbs precede verbs, and subordinate clauses precede main clauses.

Hittite syntax shows one noteworthy feature that is typical of Anatolian languages: commonly, the beginning of a sentence or clause is composed of either a sentence-connecting particle or otherwise a fronted or topicalized form, and a "chain" of fixed-order clitics is then appended.

Corpus

See also

 Hittitology

References

Sources

Introductions and overviews

Dictionaries
Goetze, Albrecht (1954). “Review of: Johannes Friedrich, Hethitisches Wörterbuch (Heidelberg: Winter)”, Language 30, pp. 401–5.
Kloekhorst, Alwin. Etymological Dictionary of the Hittite Inherited Lexicon. Leiden–Boston: Brill, 2008.
Puhvel, Jaan (1984–). Hittite Etymological Dictionary. 10 vols. Berlin: Mouton de Gruyter.
 Sturtevant, Edgar H. (1931). “Hittite glossary: words of known or conjectured meaning, with Sumerian ideograms and Accadian words common in Hittite texts”, Language 7, no. 2, pp. 3–82., Language Monograph No. 9.
 The Chicago Hittite Dictionary

Grammar
 
 
 
 
 
 
 
 
 
 Sturtevant, Edgar H. A. (1933, 1951). Comparative Grammar of the Hittite Language. Rev. ed. New Haven: Yale University Press, 1951. First edition: 1933.
 Sturtevant, Edgar H. A. (1940). The Indo-Hittite laryngeals. Baltimore: Linguistic Society of America.

Text editions
 Goetze, Albrecht & Edgar H. Sturtevant (1938). The Hittite Ritual of Tunnawi. New Haven: American Oriental Society.
 Sturtevant, Edgar H. A., & George Bechtel (1935). A Hittite Chrestomathy. Baltimore: Linguistic Society of America.

Articles

External links

 Hittite Online by Winfred P. Lehmann and Jonathan Slocum, free online lessons at the Linguistics Research Center at the University of Texas at Austin
 
 Portal Mainz (in German)
 
 The Electronic Edition of the Chicago Hittite Dictionary - The University of Chicago
 ABZU - a guide to information related to the study of the Ancient Near East on the Web
 Hittite Dictionary
 Hittite basic lexicon at the Global Lexicostatistical Database
Hittite in the wiki Glossing Ancient Languages (recommendations for the Interlinear Morphemic Glossing of Hittite texts)
 glottothèque - Ancient Indo-European Grammars online, an online collection of introductory videos to Ancient Indo-European languages produced by the University of Göttingen

 
Anatolian languages
Extinct languages of Asia
Languages attested from the 16th century BC
Languages extinct in the 13th century BC